Kampung Sungai Ba is located in the district, Samarahan Division. The village existed before the time of the Japanese occupation of Sarawak.

External links
Peta River Map (Red)

Villages in Sarawak